Geek.Kon was a multigenre convention in Madison, Wisconsin, United States.

History
The convention was started by UW students Louise Behnke, head of the SciFi Club, and Jackie Lee, head of the Anime Club. The two groups and the Madison Academics’ Gaming Enthusiast Society were planning the convention by March 2007. Geek.Kon was first held began in October 2007 at the University of Wisconsin–Madison's George L. Mosse Humanities Building as a two-day free convention. Expecting hundreds, it received over 1800 attendees. In 2008, the convention expanded to include one of the upper floors of nearby Vilas Hall. In 2009 the convention separated from the University of Wisconsin, went private, moved to the Madison Sheraton Hotel, expanded to three days, and began charging admission. Beginning in 2010, the convention moved to the Marriott Madison West Hotel in Middleton and has been there ever since.

Event history

References

External links

Multigenre conventions
Conventions in Wisconsin
Culture of Madison, Wisconsin
Wisconsin culture